Lee Mack Ritenour (born January 11, 1952) is an American jazz guitarist who has been active since the late 1960s.

Biography
Ritenour was born on January 11, 1952, in Los Angeles, California, United States. At the age of eight he started playing guitar and four years later decided on a career in music. When he was 16 he played on his first recording session with the Mamas & the Papas. He developed a love for jazz and was influenced by guitarist Wes Montgomery. At the age of 17 he worked with Lena Horne and Tony Bennett. He studied classical guitar at the University of Southern California.

1976–1988

Ritenour's solo career began with the album First Course (1976), a good example of the jazz-funk sound of the 1970s, followed by Captain Fingers, The Captain's Journey (1978), and Feel the Night (1979).

In 1979, he "was brought in to beef up" one of Pink Floyd's The Walls heaviest rock numbers, "Run Like Hell". He played "uncredited rhythm guitar" on "One of My Turns".
As the 1980s began, Ritenour began to add stronger elements of pop to his music, beginning with Rit (1981). Rit became his only release to chart in Australia, peaking at number 98. "Is It You" with vocals by Eric Tagg reached No. 15 on the Billboard pop chart and No. 27 on the Soul chart. The track peaked at number fifteen on Hot Adult Contemporary chart. He continued with the pop-oriented music for Rit/2 (1982) and Banded Together (1984), while releasing a Direct-Disk instrumental album in 1983 called On the Line. He also provided rhythm guitar on Tom Browne's album Funkin' for Jamaica. He recorded Harlequin (1985) with Dave Grusin and vocals by Ivan Lins. His next album, Earth Run, was nominated for a Grammy Award for Best Jazz Fusion Performance. The album's title track was also Grammy nominated in the category of Best Instrumental Composition. Portrait (GRP, 1987) included guest performances by the Yellowjackets, Djavan, and Kenny G.

In 1988, his Brazilian influence came to the forefront on Festival, an album featuring his work on nylon-string guitar. He changed direction with his straight-ahead jazz album Stolen Moments which he recorded with saxophonist Ernie Watts, pianist Alan Broadbent, bassist John Patitucci, and drummer Harvey Mason. During the same year, he composed the theme song for the Canadian TV series Ramona.

1990–present
In 1991 Ritenour and keyboardist Bob James formed the group Fourplay. He left the group in 1997 and was replaced by Larry Carlton. He released the career retrospective  Overtime in 2005. Smoke n' Mirrors came out the next year with the debut of his thirteen-year-old son, Wesley, on drums.

Celebrating his fifty years as a guitarist in 2010, Ritenour released 6 String Theory, a title that refers to six musical areas covered by the use of guitar.

Ritenour has been a judge for the Independent Music Awards.

Lead vocalists 
Lee Ritenour’s first few solo albums consisted entirely of instrumentals. Beginning with Captain Fingers (1977), Ritenour used vocalists on many of his songs:
 Djavan
 Bill Champlin 
 Eric Tagg
 Patti Austin
 Ivan Lins
 Phil Perry
 João Bosco
 Kate Markowitz
 Maxi Priest
 Lisa Fischer
 Michael McDonald

Awards

Grammy Awards
Ritenour has received one Grammy award out of sixteen nominations.

 Album of the Year, Jazziz magazine (2010)
 Best International Instrumentalist, Echo Jazz Award (2011)

Discography

Albums

Charted singles

As a member 
Fourplay
 Fourplay (Warner Bros., 1991)
 Between the Sheets (Warner Bros., 1993)
 Elixir (Warner Bros., 1995)
 Best of Fourplay (Warner Bros., 1997)

L.A. Workshop
 Norwegian Wood (This Bird Has Flown) (Denon, 1988)
 Norwegian Wood, Vol. 2 (Denon, 1994)

GRP All-Star Big Band
 GRP All-Star Big Band (GRP, 1992)

Other credits 
 1977 "Strawberry Letter 23" from the album Right On Time by Brothers Johnson
 1987 Joyride - track 6 "Midi Citi" - (En Pointe)
 1985 American Flyer (Original Motion Picture Soundtrack) with Greg Mathieson - GRP

As sideman 

With Alessi Brothers
 Driftin (A&M, 1977)
 Words & Music (A&M, 1978)With Patti Austin Love Is Gonna Getcha (GRP, 1990)
 That Secret Place (GRP, 1994)With Carole Bayer Sager Carole Bayer Sager (Elektra, 1977)
 ...Too (Elektra, 1978)
 Sometimes Late at Night (Boardwalk, 1981)With George Benson Give Me the Night (Warner Bros., 1980)
 Songs and Stories (Concord, 2009)With The Brothers Johnson Look Out for #1 (A&M, 1977)
 Right on Time (A&M, 1978)With Natalie Cole Thankful (Capitol, 1977)
 Stardust (Elektra, 1996)With Brass Fever Brass Fever (Impulse!, 1975)
 Time Is Running Out (Impulse!, 1976)With Aretha Franklin You (Atlantic, 1975)
 Sweet Passion (Atlantic, 1977)With Art Garfunkel Breakaway (Columbia, 1975)
 Fate for Breakfast (Columbia, 1979)With Margie Joseph Hear the Words, Feel the Feeling (Cotillion, 1976)
 Feeling My Way (Atlantic, 1978)With Bill LaBounty Promised Love (Curb, 1975)
 This Night Won't Last Forever (Warner Bros., 1978)With Melissa Manchester Don't Cry Out Loud (Arista, 1978)
 Mathematics (MCA, 1985)With Alphonse Mouzon Mind Transplant (Blue Note, 1974)
 The Man Incognito (Blue Note, 1975)With Leo Sayer Endless Flight (Chrysalis, 1976)
 Thunder in My Heart (Chrysalis, 1977)With Carly Simon Playing Possum (Elektra, 1975)
 Torch (Warner Bros., 1981)With Barbra Streisand Lazy Afternoon (Columbia, 1975)
 Songbird (Columbia, 1978)
 Guilty (Columbia, 1980) – rec. 1979–80With others'''
 Herb Alpert, Herb Alpert / Hugh Masekela (Horizon, 1978)
 Paul Anka, The Painter (United Artists, 1976)
 Stephen Bishop, Careless (ABC, 1976)
 Lisa Hartman Black, Lisa Hartman (Kirshner, 1976)
 Bobby Bland, Reflections in Blue (ABC, 1977)
 Glen Campbell, Basic (Capitol, 1978)
 Captain & Tennille, Make Your Move (Casablanca, 1979)
 Keith Carradine, I'm Easy (Asylum, 1976)
 David Castle, Castle in the Sky (Parachute, 1977)
 Cher, I'd Rather Believe in You (Warner Bros., 1976)
 Judy Collins, Hard Times for Lovers (Elektra, 1979)
 Paulinho da Costa, Agora (Pablo, 1977)
 John Denver, I Want to Live (RCA, 1977)
 Diana DeGarmo, Blue Skies (RCA, 2004)
 Neil Diamond, Heartlight (Columbia, 1982)
 Sheena Easton, A Private Heaven (EMI, 1984) – rec. 1983–84
 Yvonne Elliman, Yvonne (RSO, 1979)
 Roberta Flack, I'm the One (Atlantic, 1982)
 Pink Floyd, The Wall (EMI, 1979)
 Ted Gärdestad, Blue Virgin Isles (Polar, 1978)
 Dizzy Gillespie, Free Ride (Pablo, 1977)
 Cyndi Grecco, Making Our Dreams Come True (Private Stock Records, 1976)
 Lani Hall, Sweet Bird (A&M, 1976)
 John Handy, Carnival (Impulse, 1977)
 Eddie Henderson, Comin' Through (Capitol, 1977)
 Joe Henderson, Black Miracle (Milestone, 1976)
 Marcia Hines, Ooh Child (Miracle Records, 1979)
 Al Jarreau, All Fly Home (Warner Bros., 1978)
 Al Johnson, Back for More (Columbia, 1980)
 Quincy Jones, Roots (A&M, 1977)
 Karimata, Jezz (Aquarius, 1991) – on "Rainy Days and You" only
 B.B. King, King Size (ABC, 1977)
 Ben E. King, Let Me Live in Your Life (Atlantic, 1978)
 Carole King, Speeding Time (Atlantic, 1983)
 Peggy Lee, Let's Love (Atlantic, 1974)
 Kenny Loggins, Celebrate Me Home (Columbia, 1977) – rec. 1975–76
 Mary MacGregor, Mary MacGregor (RSO, 1980)
 Barry Manilow, Even Now (Arista, 1978)
 Lonette McKee, Words and Music (Warner Bros., 1978)
 Bette Midler, Broken Blossom (Atlantic, 1977)
 Walter Murphy, Phantom of the Opera (Private Stock, 1978)
 Anne Murray, Together (Capitol, 1975)
 Oliver Nelson, Skull Session (Flying Dutchman, 1975)
 David "Fathead" Newman, Keep the Dream Alive (Prestige, 1978)
 Olivia Newton-John, Soul Kiss (MCA, 1985)
 Kenny Nolan, A Song Between Us (Polydor, 1978)
 Freda Payne, Hot (Capitol, 1979)
 June Pointer, Baby Sister (Planet, 1983)
 Michel Polnareff, Michel Polnareff (Atlantic, 1975)
 Minnie Riperton, Love Lives Forever (Capitol, 1980) – rec. 1978
 Sonny Rollins, The Way I Feel (Milestone, 1977)
 Brenda Russell, Between the Sun and the Moon (Dome, 2004)
 Evie Sands, Suspended Animation (RCA Victor, 1979)
 Lalo Schifrin, Rollercoaster (MCA, 1977) – soundtrack
 Diane Schuur, Schuur Thing (GRP, 1985)
 Nancy Shanks, Nancy Shanx (United Artists, 1977)
 Seals and Crofts, Get Closer (Warner Bros., 1976)
 Neil Sedaka, In the Pocket (Elektra, 1980)
 Raul Seixas, O Dia em que a Terra Parou (WEA, 1977)
 Livingston Taylor, Three Way Mirror (Epic, 1978)
 Naoko Terai, Live (Videoarts Music, 2001)
 Stanley Turrentine, Everybody Come On Out (Fantasy, 1976)
 Frankie Valli, Valli (Private Stock, 1976)
 Sarah Vaughan, Songs of the Beatles (Atlantic, 1981)
 Grover Washington Jr., The Best Is Yet to Come (Elektra, 1982)
 Syreeta Wright, Syreeta'' (Tamla, 1980)

References

External links 

 Lee Ritenour official site
Lee Ritenour Interview NAMM Oral History Program (2014)

1952 births
Living people
20th-century American guitarists
21st-century American guitarists
American jazz guitarists
American session musicians
Brass Fever members
Concord Records artists
Decca Records artists
Discovery Records artists
Elektra Records artists
Epic Records artists
Fourplay members
Grammy Award winners
GRP All-Star Big Band members
GRP Records artists
Guitarists from California
Singers from California
Smooth jazz guitarists
The Love Unlimited Orchestra members
USC Thornton School of Music alumni
Warner Records artists